Phakellistatin 13 is a cytotoxic cycloheptapeptide isolated from marine sponge.

References

Cyclic peptides